The Loch is a science fiction novel and Legal thriller by Steve Alten, and was first published in 2005. The novel is the story of marine biologist Zachary Wallace. A sequel titled Vostok: Sequel to the Loch released in 2015. A third book, The Loch: Heaven's Lake was released in 2022.

Plot summary
This synopsis is told in chronological order, as opposed to the order events happen in the novel.

Shortly after the death of William Wallace, a group of Knight Templars bring his heart to Loch Ness with the intent to hide it in a cavern. They are aware that monsters use the cavern as a path to the ocean, so they deliberately block their path so they can serve as guardians. Each year the Knights will raise and lower a gate that allows several adult monsters to enter but not leave. Believing the monsters are the spawn of Satan and using them makes them complicit, the Knights rename themselves the Black Knights. In the resulting chaos the monsters kill all but one of them, Wallace's cousin and protagonist Zachary Wallace's ancestor, who swears to protect the relic. 

Hundreds of years later Scottish-American marine biologist Zachary Wallace has found his career ended and his name disgraced after a disastrous expedition into the Sargasso Sea results in the loss of an expensive submersible and its pilot. The submersible had been attacked by an unseen creature Zachary identifies as the source of the mysterious phenomenon "The Bloop". He is able to escape the creature, but drowns in the process. He is revived, but suffers severe PTSD and night terrors, drinking heavily to keep them at bay. His self-destruction is interrupted when he learns that his father Angus is on trial for murder back in Scotland and needs his help. He is being accused of murdering wealthy land developer Johnny Cialino over debts owed from Angus selling Cialino the Wallace family land. A suspicious Zachary complies and when back in Scotland, reunites with his childhood friend True MacDonald and his sister Brandy, with whom Zachary is immediately smitten. During the trial Angus claims that Cialino was attacked by the Loch Ness Monster after falling into the Loch Ness. He and his lawyer, Angus's son and Zachary's half-brother Maxie, also claim that Zachary was attacked seventeen years ago by the monster, but survived after he was pulled from the water by True's father, Albin "Crabbit" MacDonald. Zachary is forced to take the stand, where he is questioned about not only the attack but a rejected dissertation he had written about the possibility of the Loch Ness Monster's existence. He vehemently denies that the attack was anything other than a submerged log resurfacing from the bottom of the loch and adds that he had only gone out to the loch due to Angus ditching him to go sleep with a teenager. 

Increased attacks on visitors eventually forces Zachary to realize that although the legends surrounding "Nessie" are just folklore, a monster does truly exist and that Angus's claim about his childhood was true. To find out the full truth he investigates the loch, a process hampered by the Black Knights order, one of whom is Albin. The town council hires Zachary's former boss David, who had fired him while he was still in hospital, to lead teams of monster hunters in an expedition to find and capture Nessie. David is quick to malign Zachary in a press conference, infuriating Zachary, particularly when he hires Brandy to serve as captain for her looks and because he wants to sleep with her. For her part, Brandy sees this as an opportunity to punish Zachary for not being honest and open with her about his phobias and feelings, only entertaining David's advances when she knows Zachary is around. Through his investigations Zachary learns that the monster's violent behaviors were caused by construction near its lair as well as oil pollution that has been seeping into Loch Ness. It also becomes clear that previous hunts for the monster were futile due to the use of active sonar, which aggravates it and sends it deep underwater. Zachary informs David that he must use passive sonar to find the monster in exchange for access to his sonar arrays. David successfully locates the monster and tries to trap it in Urquhart Bay, only for this to fail and cost him his life. The disaster does, however, result in Brandy and Zachary reconciling and becoming a couple. That same night Zachary puts the final pieces of the puzzle together and realizes that Nessie is a distant cousin and predecessor to the Anguilla eel. Talks with members of the Black Knight also informs him of the gate and its destruction due to dynamite blasting for bridge construction many years ago. Several monsters remained, but eventually they died off until only Nessie was left. This causes Zachary to realize that the monsters were migrating to the Sargasso Sea and that the attack on his expedition was caused by other monsters that remained outside of the Loch. 

Zachary decides that he must clear the path and free Nessie, particularly when the trial ends with Angus found guilty, as this would help provide the needed information to keep his father safe from a possible death penalty. He convinces True to retrieve a deep sea diving suit, which Zachary uses to travel to the monster's lair. On the way he is attacked by Nessie and dragged into the lair, which is filled with large and aggressive eels. It is also the place where the oil is leaking into the loch. Zachary is able to hold them off using his lamps and by setting the oil on fire. He clears the blockage keeping the tunnel closed, but is trapped underwater in the process. He almost dies from drowning again, but is saved by his father (who escaped from prison to rescue him) and Albin. The three men are then forced to fight Nessie, as the monster is too vicious and aggressive to leave alive. Just as death seems certain Zachary finds his ancestor's sword and uses it to slay the Loch Ness Monster. The three men make their way to the surface and reunite with Brandy and True. Before leaving, however, Zachary brings along the body of Cialino, in order to show proof that Angus was innocent. 

Zachary spends the next few days in hospital while Albin reconnects with his children, with whom he had been somewhat estranged. During his stay he is visited by his father, who reveals that he had wanted the monster dead himself for several reasons: the monster had killed his father while they were handling the gate and because it had also gone after Zachary. Angus had brought Zachary to Scotland and deliberately provoked him in order to force his son to face his demons. He then gives Zachary a document giving him half of the family land, which was only being leased to Cialino to build a resort. Once out of the hospital Zachary is given access to underground tunnels used by the Black Knights, who induct him into the Knights Templar. Afterwards Zachary informs Angus that he had found evidence that Cialino's death was not accidental and that Angus had conditioned the monster to attack under specific conditions. Furthermore, Angus was aware that Cialino was abusing his wife and was also responsible for the oil leak, giving him ample reason to want the man dead. Angus does not give Zachary an answer and instead winks before driving off with Cialino's widow. 

The novel ends with Zachary and Brandy, now married, leading a successful investigation to find the monsters in the Sargasso Sea. His night terrors have not resurfaced and the two are expecting a child.

Development 
While researching the book Alten spent time in Scotland. He consulted cryptozoologists and experts on the legend of the Loch Ness Monster such as Bill McDonald, whose study of Loch Ness prompted Alten to delay the book so he could change some portions to better reflect his findings. 

Alten also ran a contest on his website where the winner's name would be used for a character in the novel.

Release 
Prior to publishing The Loch Alten had released four books through Tor Books. The books had received middling sales, which Alten had attributed to a lack of promotion. He chose to instead release The Loch through an independent publisher, Tsunami Books, as they promised better publicity. The Loch was first published in hardback in May 2005 through Tsunami Books, and per Alten, received better sales. This was followed up by a paperback edition in 2006, also through Tsunami Books. 

In 2009 an illustrated mass market paperback was published, this time through Tor Books, which also published an ebook edition in 2013. An audiobook adaptation narrated by P. J. Ochlan was released in 2016 through Blackstone Audio, and in 2018 Alten published a re-edited collector's edition of the novel that was accompanied by photos, maps, 3D images, adn a report on the Loch Ness Monster.

Reception 
Ron Bernas of the Detroit Free Press gave the novel 3 stars, noting that while he had some "quibbles" with the book such as the motives of Zach's father Angus and the romance between Zach and Brandy, that its pacing and science made up for this.

Sequels 
A sequel, Vostok: Sequel to the Loch was published in 2015. A third book, The Loch: Heaven's Lake, was published in audiobook format in 2022 through Blackstone Audio.

Film adaptation 
Film rights to The Loch were purchased in 2007 by Belle Avery, who had also purchased the rights for Alten's The Meg.

References

External links
The Loch Trailer at YouTube

2005 American novels
American adventure novels
American science fiction novels
Legal thriller novels
American mystery novels
Novels by Steve Alten
Loch Ness Monster in fiction